IGOR Pro is a scientific data analysis software, numerical computing environment and programming language that runs on Windows or Mac operating systems. It is developed by WaveMetrics Inc., and was originally aimed at time series analysis, but has since then evolved and covers other applications such as curve fitting and image processing. It comes with a fully functional programming language and compiler, but many functions are also accessible through menus. IGOR Pro is primarily known for its graphics capabilities, and like Origin and other similar programs, is often used to generate plots for scientific and other publications.  Other features include the possibility of extending the built-in functions with external operations (XOP) allowing data acquisition, manipulation and analysis features, communication with external devices and in principle any other task that can be programmed in C or C++.

It was first released as "Igor" in 1989, and became "Igor Pro" circa 1994

Features 

Igor Pro has several features that distinguish it from other graphing programs. The most significant ones are:

 It is completely programmable with a compiled, C-like programming language.
 Igor features a hybrid interface that allows to control the program either with a command line or with clicking menu entries with the mouse.
 It allows to store data in up to four-dimensional, sophisticated arrays (called "waves").

The concept of Igor's "waves" 

Waves are up to four-dimensional arrays that can carry not only numbers, but also characters (text), or date-and-time entries. Waves can carry meta-information, for example, the physical units of each dimension. Igor offers a wide choice of methods to work with these waves. It is possible to do image-processing with images that have been saved as two- or three-dimensional waves. In addition, two-dimensional waves can be used for matrix calculations.

Capabilities of Igor's programming language 
Without the optional add-on packages (XOP, NIDAQ Tools), Igor's programming language supports, amongst others, the following concepts

 Generating compiled code (although no independent .exe file is created)
 Handling of variables, strings, and waves
 Formatted output
 Regular expressions
 Making graphical user interfaces
 FTP and HTTP communication
 Reading/writing operations on the hard drive

Community 

Complementing the professional development and support provided by WaveMetrics, a broad community of users and enthusiasts provide user-to-user support through a mailing list, IgorExchange(a collaborative web site sponsored by WaveMetrics whose main features are a forum and places where programmers can share extensions, complete projects or "code snippets"), and GitHub repositories.

Several large scientific user facilities, such as Argonne National Laboratory, have developed and published data analysis libraries for Igor Pro. The control and data-acquisition programs for photoelectron spectrometers of ScientaOmicron 

and SPECS Surface Nano Analysis GmbH 

save spectra in Igor Pro file formats.

The “INO MAKRO” was developed in Japan for the analysis of x-ray absorption and photoemission spectra.

Igor Pro has been used as platform for the modelling of impedance data. The first reported application was mechanical impedance data, specifically pneumatic performance of the lung (published in a peer reviewed article from a hospital at the east coast in USA). A more recent application is for electrochemical impedance spectroscopy data, developed at NIMS in Japan.

See also 
List of graphing software

External links 
 Wavemetrics Inc.  (manufacturer)
 IgorExchange Projects, extensions and code share.
 Igor mailing list Unofficial archive of Igor mailing list.
 GitHub repositories 
 Book: "Programming in Igor Pro" (for Igor 7)
 Unofficial IGOR programming manual. Development funded by Wavemetrics, Inc. (for Igor 5)

References 

Plotting software
Regression and curve fitting software